The Hidden Game of Baseball is a book by baseball statisticians John Thorn and Pete Palmer. It was published in 1984, and is considered to be a seminal work in the fields of sabermetrics and baseball history.

Overview 
Thorn and Palmer began collaborating on an encyclopedia under the working title Complete Baseball, but could not meet the publisher's schedule. Instead, they began working on a smaller work focused on sabermetrics. The Hidden Game reappraised the relationship between in-game activity and the outcome of baseball games, suggesting that many of the statistics traditionally focused on up to that point did not meaningfully contribute to the likelihood of wins or losses. In particular, the book demonstrated that there was a stronger correlation between runs scored and the outcome of games. It is also credited with popularizing the use of run expectation tables in baseball analysis.

The book received critical praise at the time of its publication, and has since been reprinted.

See also 
 The Hidden Game of Football, book on football statistics by Thorn and Palmer
 Baseball Abstract, book on sabermetrics by Bill James
 Total Baseball''

References 

Baseball statistics
Baseball strategy